Sir Francis Fane of Fulbeck  supported the Royalist cause during the English Civil War.

Biography
Fane was the third, but second surviving, son of Francis Fane, 1st Earl of Westmorland.

Fane was made a Knight of the Bath at the coronation of Charles I. During the English Civil War he was appointed by the Duke of Newcastle to be governor of Doncaster for the King, and afterwards of Lincoln Castle.

Lincoln was besieged by Edward, Earl of Manchester on 3 May 1644. An attempt to break the siege was made by George, Lord Goring on 5 May, but he found the Parliamentary forces too strong and retreated. The next night the Lincoln Castle (a key defensive structure) was stormed with the use of scaling ladders. Sir Francis Fane, Sir Charles Dallison, and 100 other officers and gentlemen, and 800 soldiers were taken prisoner.

He obtained some reputation as a dramatic writer, having left, besides some poems, three dramatic pieces. He was elected a Fellow of the Royal Society in May 1663 (and expelled in 1682).

Fane was seated at Fulbeck, in Lincolnshire, and at Aston in Yorkshire, where he resided the latter part of his life.

Family
Fane's siblings included, Mildmay Fane, 2nd Earl of Westmorland; Rachel, Countess of Bath; and Colonel the Hon. George Fane.

Elizabeth was co-heir with her brother, John West, Esq. She died in 1669, aged 62 or 63, leaving her four sons and six daughters by Sir Francis Fane:
 Francis, who became a dramatist
 William, who died unmarried
 Henry
 Edward, who married Jane, third daughter of James Stanier, of London, merchant, still living 1679. Edward died in 1679, aged 37, and was buried at St Martin-in-the-Fields, London
 Mary, married to a man by the surname of Marshall, of Fisherton, Lincolnshire
 Rachael
 Elizabeth married Thomas Wodhull, of Mollington in Oxfordshire, Esq. and died 2 May 1678
 Catherine
 Grace, wife of William Grove, of Shropshire, Esq.
 Jane

Notes

References
 
 
 

Attribution

External links
 Cracroft's Peerage

Cavaliers
Original Fellows of the Royal Society
Younger sons of earls
Francis
1610s births
1680s deaths
Year of birth uncertain
Year of death uncertain